Mons. Marijan Oblak (December 8, 1919 in Veli Rat, Dugi otok – February 15, 2008 in Zadar) was a Croatian archbishop of the Archdiocese of Zadar in the Catholic Church.

He was ordained a priest on August 5, 1945, in Šibenik. From 1945 to 1949, he was prefect in the diocesan children's seminary in Šibenik, as well as a teacher at a state gymnasium. From 1949 to 1951 he was prefect of the archdiocese's seminary Zmajević in Zadar. From 1955 to 1958 he served as vice-rector of the seminary.

He was named auxiliary bishop of Zadar on April 30, 1958, and was ordained a bishop of a titular see on July 6 of the same year in the Cathedral of St. Anastasia. He was made archbishop on August 29, 1969. He served in this position until February 2, 1996.

Marijan Oblak died on February 15, 2008, in Zadar.

External links
Archbishop Marijan Oblak at Catholic-Hierarchy.com

1919 births
2008 deaths
People from Sali, Croatia
20th-century Roman Catholic archbishops in Croatia
Archbishops of Zadar
Participants in the Second Vatican Council
Dugi Otok
Roman Catholic archbishops in Yugoslavia